The 2015 Swedish FIM Speedway Grand Prix was the sixth race of the 2015 Speedway Grand Prix season. It took place on July 25 at the G&B Arena in Målilla, Sweden.

Riders 
First reserve Peter Kildemand replaced Jarosław Hampel, who had injured himself during the 2015 Speedway World Cup. The Speedway Grand Prix Commission also nominated Antonio Lindbäck as the wild card, and Linus Sundström and Peter Ljung both as Track Reserves.

Results 
The Grand Prix was won by Nicki Pedersen, who beat Tai Woffinden, Antonio Lindbäck and Matej Žagar in the final. Woffinden had initially top scored with 13 points during the qualifying rides, however Pedersen outgated his rivals in the final and stayed ahead to claim the top spot on the podium. Despite finishing second, Woffinden maintained his nine-point lead over Pedersen in the race for the world title.

Heat details

The intermediate classification

References

See also 
 motorcycle speedway

2015 Speedway Grand Prix
2015 in Swedish motorsport
Speedway Grand Prix of Sweden